Rhinoscapha schmeltzi is a species of true weevil family. It occurs in New Britain, Duke of York Island.

References 

 Zipcodezoo
 Global species

schmeltzi
Entiminae
Beetles described in 1877